, also known as Spy Room, is a Japanese light novel series written by Takemachi and illustrated by Tomari. Fujimi Shobo published the first volume under their Fujimi Fantasia Bunko imprint in January 2020. As of January 2023, nine main series volumes and three short story volumes have been released.

A manga adaptation with illustrations by Kaname Seu was serialized in Media Factory's Monthly Comic Alive magazine between May 2020 and April 2022. As of July 2022, its chapters have been collected into three tankōbon volumes. A second part of the manga by Benishake and a third part by Seu both began serializiation in the same magazine in June 2022.

An anime television series adaptation by Feel premiered in January 2023.

Plot
After a devastating war, there has been a realization that weapons are now too powerful and destructive. Thus ends the era of war fought in the "light" and begins the era of war fought within "darkness", a war fought with information and trickery, a war of spies. After the destruction of the spy team Inferno, their only surviving member, Klaus, sets off to create a team who specializes in "Impossible Missions". Impossible missions are missions that a spy team has already failed thus leading to higher security resulting in a chance of failure to be 90 percent. 

The problem? The seven girls that Klaus has recruited are all washouts and bottom of the barrel for the spy schools they hailed from. Klaus only has a month to teach them everything he knows and in turn the girls will have to employ every possible trick to have a chance of surviving.

Characters

Lamplight

The boss of Lamplight and former member of Inferno, 20 years old, code name Bonfire, who re-established Lamplight after Inferno was wiped out. Self proclaimed "the Greatest Spy in the World". Despite being "the Greatest Spy in the World" but he is terrible at teaching as he does things intuitively. 

She has silver hair, 17 years old, code name . The team leader of Lamplight. Her specialty is using poison to disable her enemies while she has a special immunity to poison herself. She wants to become a spy due to her life being saved by one after she survived a poison gas attack during the Great War.  Due to her concern for the Lamplight team and her own skills, she is designated by Klaus to be the team leader for Lamplight. 

She has red hair, 18 years old, code name . She is good with disguises. She was a daughter of politician but for some reason she was forced out of her birthplace, and she seems to have decided to become a spy. Although she has an excellent brain, she has a deep-rooted distaste for men

 She has white hair, 17 years old, code name . She is good at stealing and the most athletic member of the team. She was born into a gangster family, which she and her younger siblings were forced to help in gang activities. She has a strong sense of justice and wanted to be a spy to protect her younger siblings.

 She has cerulean hair, 16 years old, code name . The most talented as a spy amongst the members of Lamplight. She is the daughter of an artist, but she ran away from home and aspired to be a spy.

 She has black hair, 18 years old, code name . The oldest and most attractive member of Lamplight, she is good with negotiations. She was the daughter of a newspaper company president and abducted when she was 11 as a hostage. She was saved by spy who she admired and became her inspiration to becoming a spy. 

 She has brown hair, 15 years old, code name . She is good with rearing animals. She is a timid but kind-hearted girl who tends to add "ssu" at the end of her words.  She is the daughter of chef and restaurant owner in a rural town.

 She has ash pink hair, 14 years old, code name . She is good with engineering. She has no memories from her past before she join training school, and she became a spy because of her special skills, without even knowing who she was.

She has blonde hair, 14 years old, code name . The eighth and youngest member of Lamplight who arrived at Heat Haze Palace and joined Lamplight a day later than other members, due to running into a series of accidents. She is good at predicting misfortune before it occurs. She was born into an aristocratic family and lost her parents in a tragic mansion fire. Since the loss, she's been plagued with misfortune at an alarming rate. After so many close brushes with misfortune, she developed a sense for bad luck which she states holds a certain smell.

Media

Light novels
The light novel is written by Takemachi and illustrated by Tomari; Fujimi Shobo published the first volume under its Fujimi Fantasia Bunko imprint on January 18, 2020. As of January 2023, nine volumes of the main series have been released. Three short story volumes have also been released. Asaura is listed as "assistance with firearm research" of the series.

Before the first volume was published, a promotional video was released, where Yūichirō Umehara, Sora Amamiya, Miku Itō, Nao Tōyama, Aoi Yūki, Sumire Uesaka, Ayane Sakura and Tomori Kusunoki played the roles of the members in Lamplight. It was the first time for a promotional video of a light novel series to feature as many as eight voice actors.

In January 2021, Yen Press announced they licensed the series for English publication.

During their New York Comic-Con 2022 panel, Yen Press announced that they had also licensed the short story collections.

Volume list

Main series

Short stories

Manga
A manga adaptation, illustrated by Kaname Seu, was serialized in Media Factory's Monthly Comic Alive magazine from May 27, 2020 to April 27, 2022. As of July 2022, the individual chapters have been collected into three tankōbon volumes. A second part of the manga illustrated by Benishake and a third part illustrated by Seu both began serializiation in the same magazine on June 27, 2022.

Yen Press is also publishing the first part of the manga adaptation in English.

Volume list

First part

Second part

Third part

Anime
An anime television series adaptation was announced during the "Fantasia Bunko Online Festival 2022" event on March 13, 2022. The series is produced by Feel and directed by Keiichiro Kawaguchi, with scripts written by Shinichi Inotsume, character designs handled by Sumie Kinoshita, and music composed by Yoshiaki Fujisawa. It premiered on January 5, 2023, on AT-X and other networks. At Anime NYC 2022, Hidive announced that the series will be streamed in North America in 2023. On February 16, 2023 it was announced that episode 8 is delayed a week from February 23 to March 2, due to COVID-19.

Reception
Rebecca Silverman from Anime News Network praised the story as fun and interesting, while criticizing what she felt were authorial stumbles trying to pull everything together. Demelza from Anime UK News praised the first volume as well, as she felt it was unique compared to most other light novels available in English.  from The Asahi Shimbun also praised the story, while criticizing the main female protagonist as underdeveloped.

In the Kono Light Novel ga Sugoi! guidebook, the series ranked second in the bunkobon category in 2021. As of February 23, 2023, the series has sold 1,100,000 units between the digital and print versions.

See also
My Friend's Little Sister Has It In for Me!, another light novel series illustrated by the same illustrator

Notes

References

External links
  
  
 

2020 Japanese novels
2023 anime television series debuts
Adventure anime and manga
Anime and manga based on light novels
Anime postponed due to the COVID-19 pandemic
AT-X (TV network) original programming
Espionage in anime and manga
Feel (animation studio)
Fujimi Fantasia Bunko
Japanese adventure novels
Light novels
Media Factory manga
School life in anime and manga
Seinen manga
Sentai Filmworks
Spy novels
Yen Press titles